Leah Novick (born 1932) is a Renewal rabbi and the second oldest woman rabbi in the United States. She lives in Carmel, California.

She graduated from Brooklyn College and also earned a master's degree in public policy. She worked as a social science researcher when her three children were young. In the late 1950s, she was part of in sit-ins and lie-ins to integrate Westchester, Pennsylvania's swimming pools.
 Later she moved to Westchester County, New York, where she helped organize Jewish groups to attend the 1963 March on Washington. She ran unsuccessfully for the New York state Legislature in 1970 and moved to Washington to work as chief aide for Bella Abzug. In 1977, she helped to coordinate the National Commission on the Observance of International Women's Year. In 1978, she worked as a guest professor at Stanford. During much of the 1980s she taught at U C Berkeley's graduate school of public policy.

Novick was a founding member of OHALAH: Association of Rabbis for Jewish Renewal. She was ordained as a Jewish Renewal rabbi in 1987. Novick was a founder of the Ruach Ha Aretz retreat group and two renewal congregations, Beit Shekhinah in Berkeley, California (1980s) and Shabbos in Carmel, California (1990s.) 

In 2012 she was the chief organizer of a retreat focusing on American women's 40 years as rabbis, called "Forty Years on the Bimah" and held October 28–30 at the Mount Madonna Center in Watsonville, California. According to Novick, this was the first interdenominational gathering of female rabbis.

She is the author of the book "On the Wings of Shekhinah" Rediscovering Judaism's Divine Feminine (Quest Books 2008), as well as a book on the history of women at Democratic political conventions. She has also recorded a CD of guided meditations with Desert Wind, and created the performance piece The Peaceful Macabee which is about groundbreaking Jewish women involved in spirituality. As of 2013 she serves as president of the educational non-profit Spirit of the Earth.

A collection of materials that document Rabbi Novick's work since her ordination in 1987 and her contributions to the Jewish Renewal movement are held at the Post-Holocaust American Judaism Archive in the University of Colorado Boulder.

References

External links
 
 

American Jewish Renewal rabbis
Women rabbis
1932 births
Living people
Brooklyn College alumni
21st-century American Jews